Shona McGarty (born 14 October 1991) is an English actress and singer who portrays Whitney Dean in the BBC soap opera EastEnders.

Career
Before joining EastEnders, McGarty had been involved in amateur musical theatre for six years, including a role in Wizard of Oz. In July 2012, McGarty was suspended from EastEnders by the acting executive producer Lorraine Newman "for repeatedly being late for filming". McGarty later regretted her behaviour as "lazy and irresponsible". The same year, McGarty performed the song A Change is Gonna Come for Children in Need 2012.

In 2018, McGarty joined 26 other celebrities and performed an original Christmas song called Rock With Rudolph, a song written and produced by Grahame and Jack Corbyn. The song was recorded in aid of Great Ormond Street Hospital and was released digitally on independent record label Saga Entertainment on 30 November 2018 under the artist name The Celebs. The music video debuted exclusively with The Sun on 29 November 2018 and had its first TV showing on Good Morning Britain on 30 November 2018.

In 2021, McGarty reunited with Saga Entertainment to record a cover of The Beatles classic "Let It Be", recorded at Metropolis Studios, in support of British charity Mind and released on 3 December 2021. McGarty was backed by a choir of celebrities including Georgia Hirst, Anne Hegerty, Ivan Kaye and Eunice Olumide who performed as part of the 2021 line up of The Celebs.

Personal life
McGarty is of Irish descent.

In January 2018, McGarty announced her engagement to long-term partner Ryan Harris. Two years later, she said they had ended their relationship.

Filmography

Television

Music videos

Discography

Singles

Awards and nominations

References

External links

 
 
 

1991 births
Living people
British soap opera actresses
English child actresses
English people of Irish descent
People from Borehamwood
Actresses from Hertfordshire
English soap opera actresses